The Chinese Nùng (Vietnamese: Người Hoa Nùng or Người Tàu Nùng; Hán-Nôm: 𠊛華農 or 𠊛艚農; Chinese: 華裔儂族) are a group of ethnic Han Chinese living in Vietnam. The Chinese Nùng composed 72% to 78% of the population of the Nung Autonomous Territory of Hai Ninh (1947–1954) located in the Vietnamese Northeast, covering parts of the present-day Quảng Ninh and Lạng Sơn provinces. 

All Tai ethnic groups in Vietnam are originated from Yunnan (China). The Chinese Nùng's name originated from the fact that almost all of them were farmers (nong nhan (農人) in Cantonese). After the Treaty of Tientsin, the French refused to recognize this group as Chinese due to political and territorial issues on Vietnam's northern frontier border, therefore the French classified them as Nùng based on their main occupation. The most widely used languages of the Chinese Nùng are Cantonese and Hakka Chinese since they descended from people speaking these languages.

After 1954, more than 50,000 Chinese Nùng led by Colonel Vong A Sang (黃亞生, or Swong A Sang) fled as refugees, joining the 1 million northern Vietnamese who fled south and resettled in South Vietnam, mostly in the Đồng Nai and Bình Thuận provinces. During the Vietnam War, Chinese Nùng soldiers were known for their loyalty to the US Special Forces. They often served as bodyguards to the Special Forces and were regarded as a good source of security for green berets who were recruiting and training locals.

Diaspora 

 

After the Fall of Saigon in 1975, many of the Chinese Nùng fled Vietnam as boat people political refugees to Hong Kong and Malaysia's refugee camps. Most were resettled in the US, Canada, France, Australia, and Singapore, among other countries.

See also  
Ngái people

Notes

References

 

 

Ethnic groups in Vietnam
Chinese people by ethnic or national origin
Hoa people